John Garty (6 January 1864 – 28 January 1897) was a New Zealand cricketer who played one match of first-class cricket for Canterbury in 1886–87.

Garty "came with a meteoric flash as a bowler" with one outstanding performance, then lost form. He was among the 24 players from whom Canterbury selected their 18 to play the touring Australians in November 1886, but was not ultimately chosen. He was in good form in senior club cricket later that season, including 7 for 42 off 75 deliveries for Midland against Grange.

Garty opened the bowling for Canterbury in their annual first-class match against Otago in February 1887 at Lancaster Park. At one stage early on the first day of the match Otago were 10 for 4, and Garty had taken all four wickets for one run. The Lyttelton Times wrote of the play at this stage: "Garty was bowling with a good length, and most of his deliveries kept very low and puzzled the Otago men a good deal." Garty bowled throughout the Otago innings, taking figures of 35.1–14–41–6 (four-ball overs) and Otago, batting one man short, were dismissed for 80. He took one wicket in the second innings, and Canterbury won by 10 wickets. He never played for Canterbury again.

Before he died Garty had been unwell for some time, and went to Sydney in 1896, dying there of "galloping consumption" in January 1897.

References

External links
 
John Garty at CricketArchive

1864 births
1897 deaths
New Zealand cricketers
Canterbury cricketers
Tuberculosis deaths in Australia
19th-century deaths from tuberculosis
Infectious disease deaths in New South Wales